Adjei Kojo is a small town in the Tema West Constituency in the Greater Accra Region of Ghana, sharing a boundary with Ashaiman. The town is mostly known for the Tetteh Ocloo State School for the Deaf.

References 

Populated places in the Greater Accra Region